The 1928 Liège–Bastogne–Liège was the 18th edition of the Liège–Bastogne–Liège cycle race and was held on 13 May 1928. The race started and finished in Liège. The race was won by Ernest Mottard.

General classification

References

1928
1928 in Belgian sport